Ron or Ronnie or Ronald Harris may refer to:

Sports
 Ron Harris (Australian footballer) (1924–2006), played for Hawthorn in the VFL
 Ron Harris (English footballer) (born 1944), 1960s-1970s English footballer
 Ron Harris, one of the two American professional wrestlers who wrestled as The Harris Brothers
 Ron Harris (ice hockey) (born 1942), former ice hockey player
 Ronnie Harris (American boxer, born 1948), American lightweight boxer; 1968 Olympic gold medalist
 Ronald Allen Harris (1947–1980), American lightweight boxer; 1964 Olympic bronze medalist
 Ronnie Harris (American football) (born 1970), former professional American football player
 Ronnie Harris (sprinter) (born 1956), American former sprinter

Others
 Ronald Dale Harris (born 1956), former computer programmer for the Nevada Gaming Control Board
 Ron Harris (photographer) (1933–2017), nude photographer
 Ron Harris, a detective character from the TV show Barney Miller